By the arrangements of the Canadian federation, the Canadian monarchy operates in Newfoundland and Labrador as the core of the province's Westminster-style parliamentary democracy. As such, the Crown within Newfoundland and Labrador's jurisdiction is referred to as the Crown in Right of Newfoundland and Labrador, His Majesty in Right of Newfoundland and Labrador, or the King in Right of Newfoundland and Labrador. The Constitution Act, 1867, however, leaves many royal duties in the province specifically assigned to the sovereign's viceroy, the lieutenant governor of Newfoundland and Labrador, whose direct participation in governance is limited by the conventional stipulations of constitutional monarchy.

Constitutional role

The role of the Crown is both legal and practical; it functions in Newfoundland and Labrador in the same way it does in all of Canada's other provinces, being the centre of a constitutional construct in which the institutions of government acting under the sovereign's authority share the power of the whole. It is thus the foundation of the executive, legislative, and judicial branches of the province's government. The —is represented and his duties carried out by the lieutenant governor of Newfoundland and Labrador, whose direct participation in governance is limited by the conventional stipulations of constitutional monarchy, with most related powers entrusted for exercise by the elected parliamentarians, the ministers of the Crown generally drawn from among them, and the judges and justices of the peace. The Crown today primarily functions as a guarantor of continuous and stable governance and a nonpartisan safeguard against the abuse of power.

This arrangement began with the granting in 1949 of royal assent to the Newfoundland Act and continued an unbroken line of monarchical government extending back to the late 15th century. However, though it has a separate government headed by the King, as a province, Newfoundland and Labrador is not itself a kingdom.

Government House in St. John's is owned by the sovereign in his capacity as King in Right of Newfoundland and Labrador and is used as an official residence both by the lieutenant governor and the sovereign and other members of the Canadian royal family will reside there when in Newfoundland and Labrador.

Royal associations

Those in the royal family perform ceremonial duties when on a tour of the province; the royal persons do not receive any personal income for their service, only the costs associated with the exercise of these obligations are funded by both the Canadian and Newfoundland and Labrador Crowns in their respective councils. Monuments around Newfoundland and Labrador mark some of those visits, while others honour a royal personage or event. Further, Newfoundland and Labrador's monarchical status is illustrated by royal names applied regions, communities, schools, and buildings, many of which may also have a specific history with a member or members of the royal family. Associations also exist between the Crown and many private organizations within the province; these may have been founded by a royal charter, received a royal prefix, and/or been honoured with the patronage of a member of the royal family. Examples include the Royal Newfoundland Constabulary, which received its royal prefix from Queen Elizabeth II in 1979, and the Royal St. John's Regatta, which had the Queen as its patron and received its royal prefix from her in 1993.

The main symbol of the monarchy is the sovereign himself, his image (in portrait or effigy) thus being used to signify government authority. A royal cypher or crown may also illustrate the monarchy as the locus of authority, without referring to any specific monarch. Further, though the monarch does not form a part of the constitutions of Newfoundland and Labrador's honours, they do stem from the Crown as the fount of honour and, so, bear on the insignia symbols of the sovereign.

History

By commission under the royal prerogative of Queen Elizabeth I, Sir Humphrey Gilbert claimed the island of Newfoundland on 5 August 1583. By the mid-1660s, however, the French Crown had also laid claim to nearly half of the same area. Disputes over the island were ended as the French kings ceded Terre Neuve to the British Crown via the Treaty of Utrecht in 1713 and later the Treaty of Paris in 1763, in-between which, in 1729, the Royal Newfoundland Constabulary was established.

David Kirke, an adventurer, privateer, and friend of King Charles I, was installed by the King as proprietary governor in 1638, also granting Kirke a coat of arms, which, in a twist of fate, are today the arms of King Charles III in Right of Newfoundland and Labrador. The year prior, Kirke and his partners had also been given, by way of a royal charter from Charles, co-proprietorship of the entire island. 

When the English Civil War between the king and parliament in England ended in 1651, with Charles I losing and being executed, Kirke lost the protection of the Crown and Newfoundland was taken by the Commonwealth of England, headed by Oliver Cromwell. Kirke died in prison in 1654, awaiting trial over his title to the lands around Ferryland. John Treworgie thereafter served as governor of Newfoundland until the restoration of the English monarchy in 1660. The Lord Baltimore was granted the Avalon Peninsula by royal patent from King Charles II, but never took up residence. Lady Kirke, the wife of David's brother, Sir Lewis Kirke, petitioned the King to make David's son, George Kirke, the governor of Newfoundland; an arrangement that had been suggested by Newfoundlanders. But, Charles demurred from appointing a resident governor.

His first impressions of the land were not positive: he stated of St John's, "truly deplorable [...] a most dreadful, inhospitable, and barren country"; though, he later changed his opinion after meeting the local women, commenting on the region's "inexhaustible supply of women of the most obliging kind."

While in Newfoundland, William found himself involved in the civil affairs on top of naval ones, as there were no permanent civil authorities and the Prince was the senior naval officer in the colony. As such, the Prince presided over a court and commissioned the construction of St. Luke's Anglican Church in Newtown. On 21 August 1786, he celebrated his 21st birthday on his ship in the waters off Newfoundland.

The colony's status was in 1825 elevated to that of a province of the Crown and, in 1907, it was made by King Edward VII, on the advice of his imperial Privy Council in London, into a Dominion of the British Empire. Following two referendums in 1948, the island joined Canadian Confederation the next year, making it the only province to do so by authority of the Canadian monarch.

Since Confederation, there have been a number of royal visits to the province. Some notable visits have included Princess Mary, Princess Royal, marking in 1964 the 50th anniversary of the departure of the first contingent of the Royal Newfoundland Regiment from St. John's to the battlefields of the First World War; Prince Charles, Prince of Wales, along with his wife Diana, Princess of Wales, visiting Newfoundland in 1983 to mark the 400th anniversary of the island becoming an English, and later British, colony; and, during her 1997 tour of Canada, Queen Elizabeth II, along with her husband, Prince Philip, Duke of Edinburgh, travelling to Bonavista to see the arrival of the Matthew, as part of the re-enactment of John Cabot's arrival on the island 500 years before.

See also
 Symbols of Newfoundland and Labrador
 Monarchy

References

External links
 Queen Elizabeth: Visits to Newfoundland and Labrador at CBC

Newfoundland and Labrador